Imamzadeh Hosein Reza or Imamzada Husain Rida ( – Emamzadeh Hosein Reza) is the tomb of an Imamzadeh in Varamin, Iran.
The building dates to Timurid Era, 1437-1438 is located north of Varamin, near local railway station and is located in the city's main cemetery. The building was enlisted among National Works of Iran on 20 December 2000 by the number 2937.

Architecture 
The building is octagonal with a recessed blind arch on each face. It was originally free-standing, but at a much later stage an entrance aiwan was built against the east side and a small domed tomb against the south side. Two of the original four entrances have been blocked up. Brickwork is the sole means of exterior decoration. The bricks measure 23 x 23 x 6 cm., many re-used ones being employed. The brickwork is clumsy. Angled bricks were not used on the corners; the ensuing vertical gap was covered by a thick coat of brownish mortar. The mortar and bricks in vertical lay at the top of the octagon and on the dome differ in color from those used elsewhere on the monument; they are undoubtedly indicative of restoration. A pyramidal roof may have been intended originally. Although the height of the tomb tower is only slightly greater than its width, a strong feeling of verticality is created by the tall blind arches on each panel. Unusually, no scaffold holes are visible on the exterior.

The interior is square with four recesses. All surfaces are covered with plaster, which has recently been given an unhappy coating of green on the inscription, light blue below it and white above. The lower panels have modern round arches. The zone of transition is divided into
eight and sixteen-sided areas. an Aluminium zarih was installed inside the tomb in 1991.

The most interesting feature of the mausoleum is its stucco decoration. Two patterns are used to frame the arches of the squinch zone; one, mainly geometrical, round the squinch arches, the other mainly vegetal, round the arches in between. The elegant thulth inscription just below the squinch
zone begins on the back wall of the west recess. A Quranic scription accompanied the following phrase at the end:"At the beginning of the month of Jumdda I year 841 "/November 1437. The decade of the figure is not quite clear; a case could also be made for 821.
Structurally the monument presents no innovations. The fourteenth century tomb towers of Qom, e.g. the Imamzada Ja'far, present close parallels. Had the monument not been dated one might have been tempted to ascribe it to the fourteenth century. The remains of stucco decoration on the double minaret portal at Qum was probably one factor in its attribution to c. 1325 when in fact the date 830/1426-27 is preserved on one of the minarets.The importance of the Imamzada Husain Rida lies in the extension of the terminus ante quem for this type of stucco decoration, which had died out by the middle of the fifteenth century.

References 

Tombs in Iran
Buildings and structures in Tehran Province
Buildings and structures completed in 1438
Varamin